Aritz Aranburu Aspiazu (born August 30, 1985, Zarauz, Spain) is a Spanish professional surfer. In 2008, he was ranked among the ASP Top 45 after having won the 2007 ASP European Title. In 2007 he was named "Best Basque Sportsman".

Biography
Aranburu began surfing on a shortboard at the age of 7. By the age of 12, he won the Basque Surfing Championship, repeating at the age of 18. He was chosen by the Basque Surf Federation to take part in the European Surf Championship in 2000 and 2002, winning his first international title at Capbreton in 2000. In 2002, he also competed in the Euro-African Surf Championship, where he finished first in Namibia and second in South Africa.

In 2007, Aranburu won the Zarauz Pro Surf title and became the European champion. He later took part in the World Qualifying Series (WCS), and as he finished the 6th, he qualified for the World Championship Tour (WCT), where he competed with the best 45 surfers of the world. In 2008, Aranburu suffered knee and ankle injuries, but managed to stay alive in the WCT.

Titles 
 2007: Zarautz Pro Surf
 2007: European champion

References 

http://www.uemcom.es/aritz-aranburu-cuando-tienes-que-enfrentarte-a-tus-heroes-cambias-el-chip-y-les-ganas
http://slabcompany.com/aritz-aranburu
http://pukassurf.com/team/aritz-aranburu
http://www.worldsurfleague.com/athletes/588/aritz-aranburu

External links 

http://www.aritzaranburu.com/ 
http://www.redbull.com/es/es/surfing/stories/1331704006720/aritz-aranburu-un-planeta-y-mil-millones-de-olas-video

1985 births
Living people
Spanish surfers